The earliest recorded systems of weights and measures originate in the 3rd or 4th millennium BC. Even the very earliest civilizations needed measurement for purposes of agriculture, construction and trade. Early standard units might only have applied to a single community or small region, with every area developing its own standards for lengths, areas, volumes and masses. Often such systems were closely tied to one field of use, so that volume measures used, for example, for dry grains were unrelated to those for liquids, with neither bearing any particular relationship to units of length used for measuring cloth or land. With development of manufacturing technologies, and the growing importance of trade between communities and ultimately across the Earth, standardized weights and measures became critical. Starting in the 18th century, modernized, simplified and uniform systems of weights and measures were developed, with the fundamental units defined by ever more precise methods in the science of metrology. The discovery and application of electricity was one factor motivating the development of standardized internationally applicable units.

Sources of information

The comparison of the dimensions of buildings with the descriptions of contemporary writers is another source of information. An interesting example of this is the comparison of the dimensions of the Greek Parthenon with the description given by Plutarch from which a fairly accurate idea of the size of the Attic foot is obtained. Because of the comparative volume of artifacts and documentation, much more is known today about the state-sanctioned measures of large, advanced societies than about those of smaller societies or about the informal measures that often coexisted with official ones. In some cases, there are only plausible theories and different interpretations can be matched to the evidences.

It is possible to group official measurement systems for large societies into historical systems that are relatively stable over time, including: the Babylonian system, the Egyptian system, the Phileterian system of the Ptolemaic age, the Olympic system of Greece, the Roman system, the British system, and the metric system.

Earliest known measurement systems

The earliest known uniform systems of weights and measures seem all to have been created at some time in the 4th and 3rd millennia BC among the ancient peoples of Egypt, Mesopotamia and the Indus Valley, and perhaps also Elam (in Iran) as well.

Early Babylonian and Egyptian records and the Hebrew Bible indicate that length was first measured with the forearm, hand, or finger and that time was measured by the periods of the sun, moon, and other heavenly bodies. When it was necessary to compare the capacities of containers such as gourds or clay or metal vessels, they were filled with plant seeds which were then counted to measure the volumes. When means for weighing were invented, seeds and stones served as standards. For instance, the carat, still used as a unit for gems, was derived from the carob seed.

History of units

Units of length
The Egyptian cubit, the Indus Valley units of length referred to above, and the Mesopotamian cubit were used in the 3rd millennium BC and are the earliest known units used by ancient peoples to measure length. The units of length used in ancient India included the dhanus, or dhanush (bow), the krosa (cry, or cow-call) and the yojana (stage).

The common cubit was the length of the forearm from the elbow to the tip of the middle finger. It was divided into the span of the hand or the length between the tip of little finger to the tip of the thumb (one-half cubit), the palm or width of the hand (one sixth), and the digit or width of the middle finger (one twenty-fourth). The Royal Cubit, which was a standard cubit enhanced by an extra palm—thus 7 palms or 28 digits long—was used in constructing buildings and monuments and in surveying in ancient Egypt. The inch, foot, and yard evolved from these units through a complicated transformation not yet fully understood. Some believe they evolved from cubic measures; others believe they were simple proportions or multiples of the cubit. In whichever case, the Greeks and Romans inherited the foot from the Egyptians. The Roman foot (~296 mm) was divided into both 12 unciae (inches) (~24.7 mm) and 16 digits (~18.5 mm). The Romans also introduced the mille passus (1000 paces) or double steps, the pace being equal to five Roman feet (~1480 mm). The Roman mile of 5000 feet (1480 m) was introduced into England during the occupation. Queen Elizabeth I (reigned from 1558 to 1603) changed, by statute, the mile to 5280 feet (~1609 m) or 8 furlongs, a furlong being 40 rod (unit)s (~201 m) of 5.5 yards (~5.03 m) each.

The introduction of the yard (0.9144 m) as a unit of length came later, but its origin is not definitely known. Some believe the origin was the double cubit, others believe that it originated from cubic measure. Whatever its origin, the early yard was divided by the binary method into 2, 4, 8, and 16 parts called the half-yard, span, finger, and nail. The association of the yard with the "gird" or circumference of a person's waist or with the distance from the tip of the nose to the end of the thumb of King Henry I (reigned 1100–1135) are probably standardizing actions, since several yards were in use in Britain.

There were also the rod, pole, perch and thumb for measurements of length. The following table lists the equivalents.

Units of mass
The grain was the earliest unit of mass and is the smallest unit in the apothecary, avoirdupois, Tower, and troy systems. The early unit was a grain of wheat or barleycorn used to weigh the precious metals silver and gold. Larger units preserved in stone standards were developed that were used as both units of mass and of monetary currency. The pound was derived from the mina (unit) used by ancient civilizations. A smaller unit was the shekel, and a larger unit was the talent. The magnitude of these units varied from place to place. The Babylonians and Sumerians had a system in which there were 60 shekels in a mina and 60 minas in a talent. The Roman talent consisted of 100 libra (pound) which were smaller in magnitude than the mina. The troy pound (~373.2 g) used in England and the United States for monetary purposes, like the Roman pound, was divided into 12 ounces, but the Roman uncia (ounce) was smaller. The carat is a unit for measuring gemstones that had its origin in the carob seed, which later was standardized at 1/144 ounce and then 0.2 gram. 

Goods of commerce were originally traded by number or volume. When weighing of goods began, units of mass based on a volume of grain or water were developed. The diverse magnitudes of units having the same name, which still appear today in our dry and liquid measures, could have arisen from the various commodities traded. The larger avoirdupois pound for goods of commerce might have been based on volume of water which has a higher bulk density than grain.

The stone, quarter, hundredweight, and ton were larger units of mass used in Britain. Today only the stone continues in customary use for measuring personal body weight. The present stone is 14 pounds (~6.35 kg), but an earlier unit appears to have been 16 pounds (~7.25 kg). The other units were multiples of 2, 8, and 160 times the stone, or 28, 112, and 2240 pounds (~12.7 kg, 50.8 kg, 1016 kg), respectively. The hundredweight was approximately equal to two talents. The ton of 2240 pounds is called the "long ton". The "short ton" is equal to 2000 pounds (~907 kg). A tonne (t) is equal to 1000 kg.

Units of time and angle
The division of the circle into 360 degrees and the day into hours, minutes, and seconds can be traced to the Babylonians who had a sexagesimal system of numbers. The 360 degrees may have been related to a year of 360 days. Many other systems of measurement divided the day differently—counting hours, decimal time, etc. Other calendars divided the year differently.

Forerunners of the metric system
Decimal numbers are an essential part of the metric system, with only one base unit and multiples created on the decimal base, the figures remain the same. This simplifies calculations. Although the Indians used decimal numbers for mathematical computations, it was Simon Stevin who in 1585 first advocated the use of decimal numbers for everyday purposes in his booklet De Thiende (old Dutch for 'the tenth'). He also declared that it would only be a matter of time before decimal numbers were used for currencies and measurements. His notation for decimal fractions was clumsy, but this was overcome with the introduction of the decimal point, generally attributed to Bartholomaeus Pitiscus who used this notation in his trigonometrical tables (1595).

In 1670, Gabriel Mouton published a proposal that was in essence similar to John Wilkins' proposal for a universal measure, except that his base unit of length would have been 1/1000 of a minute of arc (about 1.852 m) of geographical latitude. He proposed calling this unit the virga. Rather than using different names for each unit of length, he proposed a series of names that had prefixes, rather like the prefixes found in SI.

In 1790, Thomas Jefferson submitted a report to the United States Congress in which he proposed the adoption of a decimal system of coinage and of weights and measures. This would have equated to 11.755 English inches (29.8 cm) or 13.06 English inches (33.1 cm). Like Wilkins, the names that he proposed for multiples and subunits of his base units of measure were the names of units of measure that were in use at the time. The great interest in geodesy during this era, and the measurement system ideas that developed, influenced how the continental US was surveyed and parceled. The story of how Jefferson's full vision for the new measurement system came close to displacing the Gunter chain and the traditional acre, but ended up not doing so, is explored in Andro Linklater's Measuring America.

Metric conversion

The metric system was first described in 1668 and officially adopted by France in 1799. Over nineteenth and twentieth centuries, it became the dominant system worldwide, although several countries, including the United States, China, and the United Kingdom continue to use their customary units. Among the numerous customary systems, many have been adapted to become an integer multiple of a related metric unit: The Scandinavian mile is now defined as 10 km, the Chinese jin is now defined as 0.5 kg, and the Dutch ons is now defined as 100 g.

References

Further reading
, Measures and Weights in the Islamic World. An English Translation of Professor Walther Hinz's Handbook “Islamische Maße und Gewichte“, with a foreword by Professor Bosworth, F.B.A. Kuala Lumpur, ISTAC, 2002, . This work is an annotated translation of a work in German by the late German orientalist Walther Hinz, published in the Handbuch der Orientalistik, erste Abteilung, Ergänzungsband I, Heft 1, Leiden, The Netherlands: E. J. Brill, 1970.
Scales and Weights: A Historical Outline, Bruno Kisch. (New Haven: Yale University Press, 1965). Based in part on the Edward C. Streeter collection at Yale Medical Historical Library
Kula, Witold, Measures and Men. 1986. Translated by R. Szreter. Princeton University Press. .
Lugli, Emanuele, The making of measure and the promise of sameness. Chicago 2019. . OCLC 1051680735.